WBRV-FM and WLLG are commercial FM radio stations, owned by The Flack Broadcasting Group and simulcasting a country music radio format.  WBRV-FM (101.5 MHz) is licensed to Boonville, New York, and WLLG (99.3 MHz) is licensed to Lowville, New York.  WBRV-FM serves Oneida County, north of Utica while WLLG serves Lewis County, east of Watertown.

External links

BRV-FM
Country radio stations in the United States
Radio stations established in 1989
1989 establishments in New York (state)